Dioscorea dregeana, the wild yam, is a perennial creeper that is native to the eastern parts of southern Africa. It is commonly used and traded as a traditional medicine, or muti.

Range
It is native to eastern South Africa and Eswatini.

Description
A slightly thorny stem sprouts annually from a tuberous rootstock. The plant becomes dormant in winter.

References

External links

dregeana
Plants described in 1894
Yams (vegetable)